Água Gunu is a village in Mé-Zóchi District, São Tomé Island in São Tomé and Príncipe. Its population is 1,018 (2008).

Population history

References

Populated places in Mé-Zóchi District